Moravec (feminine: Moravcová) is a Czech surname. "Morava" (Moravia) is the root of the surname. It may refer to:

 David Moravec (born 1973), Czech ice hockey player
 Emanuel Moravec (1893–1945), Czech-Czechoslovak army officer, and Nazi collaborator
 František Moravec (1895–1966), Czech army officer and writer
 František Moravec (born 1939), Czech parasitologist
 Fritz Moravec (1922–1997), Austrian mountaineer
 Hans Moravec (born 1948), Austrian-Canadian scientist
 Ivan Moravec (1930–2015), Czech pianist
 Jan Moravec (born 1987), Czech footballer
 Jana Moravcová (born 1937), Czech writer
 Jiří Moravec (born 1980), Czech ice hockey player
 Josef Moravec, Czech painter
 József Moravetz (1911–1990), Romanian footballer
 Klára Moravcová (born 1983), Czech skier and biathlete
 Martina Moravcová (born 1976), Slovak swimmer
 Miroslav Moravec (1939–2009), Czech actor
 Ondřej Moravec (born 1984), Czech biathlete
 Paul Moravec (born 1957), an American composer
 Roman Moravec (1950–2009), Slovak athlete
 Rosemary Dorothy Moravec (1946–2013), Austrian-British musicologist, author and composer
 Stanislav Moravec (born 1964), Slovak footballer
 Vlastimil Moravec (1949–1986), Czech cyclist
 Zdeněk Moravec (born 1968), Czech astronomer

See also
 
 Moravčík
 Morávek
 Morawetz
 Morawitz

Czech-language surnames
Slovak-language surnames
West Slavic-language surnames
Slavic-language surnames

cs:Moravec (rozcestník)
de:Moravec (Begriffsklärung)
es:Moravec
fr:Moravec
pl:Moravec